Young in All the Wrong Ways is the third studio album by American musician Sara Watkins. It was released in July 2016 under New West Records. It reached No.1 on the Billboard Top Heatseekers Chart and No.19 on the Billboard Top Rock Chart.

Track list 
All songs written by Sara Watkins except "One Last Time" by Watkins and Jon Foreman, "Like New Year's Day" by Watkins and Dan Wilson, and "Without a Word" by Watkins and Gabe Witcher

Personnel
 Jim Gilstrap - vocals
 Greg Leisz - strings
 Patrick Warren - pump organ
 Jay Bellerose - whistle, bells
 Jean McClain - background vocals
 Niki Haris - vocals
 David Piltch - upright bass, electric bass
 Keefus Ciancia - prepared piano
 Karin Bergquist - vocals, acoustic guitar
 Levon Henry - tenor saxophone
 Linford Detweiler - vocals, acoustic guitar, electric guitar, piano, Wurlitzer organ
Jay Bellerose - Drums, Percussion

References 

2016 albums
Sara Watkins albums